FLT may refer to:

Mathematics
 Fermat's Last Theorem, in number theory
 Fermat's little theorem, using modular arithmetic
 Finite Legendre transform, in algebra

Medicine
 Alovudine (fluorothymidine), a pharmaceutical drug
 Fluorothymidine F-18, a radiolabeled pharmaceutical drug

Places
 Finger Lakes Trail, New York, United States
 Flitwick railway station, England
 Phaeton Airport, Haiti

Organizations
 Fairlight (group), a 1980s Commodore warez group
 Flight Centre, an Australian travel company (founded 1982; ASX ticker:FLT)
 Free Federation of Workers, a 20th-century Puerto Rican trade union
 Liberation Front of Chad, 1965–1976
 Luxembourg Tennis Federation, a sports governing body (founded 1946)

Other uses
 Flutter-tonguing, in music
 Foreign Language Teaching, in education

See also
FTL (disambiguation)